Donna Marie Baker (born 27 February 1966) is a former association football player who represented New Zealand at international level.

Baker made her Football Ferns debut in a 0–0 draw with Australia on 28 November 1983 and ended her international career with 35 caps and 7 goals to her credit.

Baker represented New Zealand at the Women's World Cup finals in China in 1991 playing all 3 group games; a 0–3 loss to Denmark, a 0–4 loss to Norway and a 1–4 loss to China.

References

External links

1966 births
Living people
New Zealand women's association footballers
New Zealand women's international footballers
1991 FIFA Women's World Cup players
Liverpool F.C. Women players
Odense Q players
New Zealand people of English descent
Women's association football midfielders
Expatriate women's footballers in Denmark